Fire Music is a 2021 documentary film directed by Tom Surgal about free jazz.  The documentary focuses on the key innovators associated with the movement, including John Coltrane, Ornette Coleman, Cecil Taylor, Albert Ayler, Don Cherry, and Sun Ra.

Release

An abbreviated rough cut of the film debuted at the New York Film Festival on September 29, 2018. 

Fire Music was released theatrically on September 10, 2021.

The film was also acquired by The Criterion Collection and released on VOD on June 1, 2022.

References

External links

2018 films
2018 documentary films
American documentary films
Documentary films about jazz music and musicians
2010s English-language films
2010s American films